Scatness is a settlement on the headland of Scat Ness at the southern tip of Mainland, Shetland, Scotland, across the West Voe of Sumburgh from Sumburgh Head and close to Sumburgh Airport, the Shetland Islands' main airport. Scatness is in the parish of Dunrossness.

Scatness includes the housing estates of Sanblister Place and Colonial Place. On the east side of Scat Ness are the beaches of Outer and Inner Tumble Wick, which were fishing stations.

At the south easternmost point of Scatness, off the A970 road, lies the Ness of Burgi fort, an Iron Age blockhouse probably from the same era as Shetland's brochs. The site is in the care of Historic Scotland.

Also part of Scatness are the broch, wheelhouse and post-Iron Age settlements excavated in the early 21st century.

References

Sources
 This article is based on http://shetlopedia.com/Scatness a GFDL wiki.

External links

Undiscovered Scotland - Old Scatness Broch

Villages in Mainland, Shetland